Simone Mathes (born 13 March 1975 in Stadtsteinach, Bavaria) is a retired female hammer thrower from Germany. She set her personal best (67.97 metres) on 31 May 2004 at a meet in Fränkisch-Crumbach. Mathes also competed in the discus throw and the shot put. She is a five-time national champion in the women's hammer throw (1993, 1994, 1997, 1998, and 1999).

Achievements
All results in the women's hammer throw event

References

1975 births
Living people
People from Stadtsteinach
Sportspeople from Upper Franconia
German female hammer throwers
German female discus throwers
German female shot putters